Chloe Kloezeman (born 29 May 1986) is a Greek softball player. She competed in the women's tournament at the 2004 Summer Olympics. She is of Greek descent from her mother's side. At the collegiate level Kloezeman played for Ole Miss and UC Berkeley.

References

1986 births
Living people
Greek softball players
Olympic softball players of Greece
Softball players at the 2004 Summer Olympics
People from Burlingame, California
Softball players from California
Ole Miss Rebels softball players
California Golden Bears softball players
American people of Greek descent